The 2003 World Figure Skating Championships were held at the MCI Center in Washington, D.C., USA from March 24 to 30. The senior-level international figure skating competition was sanctioned by the International Skating Union. Medals were awarded in men's singles, ladies' singles, pair skating, and ice dancing.

Medal table

Competition notes
Due to the large number of participants, the men's and ladies' qualifying groups and the ice dancing compulsory dance were split into groups A and B. Ice dancers in both groups performed the same compulsory dance. The compulsory dance was the Austrian Waltz.

Michelle Kwan won her fifth and final world championship, the most of any ladies skater since 1960.

Results

Men

Ladies

Pairs

Ice dancing

External links
 2003 World Figure Skating Championships

World Figure Skating Championships
World Figure Skating Championships
International figure skating competitions hosted by the United States
World Figure Skating Championships
World Figure Skating Championships
Sports competitions in Washington, D.C.